Badimalika Temple is a Hindu temple. It is located in Triveni Municipality, Bajura district of Sudurpashchim Province. It is one of the major temples in Nepal. It is dedicated to Bhagwati. Malika Chaturdashi is its major festival. It is served by two priests, one representing the Kalikot district, and the other Bajura district .

Story

According to Hindu legend, when Sati Devi's father Daksha Prajapati was performing a yagya, he invited all the Gods except Mahadev to the ceremony. Sati went to her father's yagya ceremony and asked him why he had not invited her husband. Daksha Prajapati answered that Mahadev drank alcohol, smoked ganja, slept in cemeteries, wore a serpent around his neck, had dreadlocks, covered his body with ash, and wore tiger hide, hence he was unsuitable to attend such an important yagya. Unable to tolerate this insult to her husband, Sati jumped into the yagya fire and gave up her life.

Mahadev was so angered by her death that he sent Birbhadra and Bhoot gana to kill Daksha Prajapati and destroy the yagya. After exacting his vengeance, Mahadev started to mourn his wife. Mahadev traveled across the world carrying Sati's corpse. During this time, Vishnu released his Sudarshan chakra and wounded Sati's body so that it could be infested by insects and rot. As Sati's body started to disintegrate, the ground on which her body parts fell became Shakti Peethas, places of worship. In this process, her left shoulder fell on the Mallagiri mountain. Mallagiri was then referred to as Malika.

References

Hindu temples in Sudurpashchim Province
Buildings and structures in Bajura District